Elemental is an upcoming American computer-animated romantic drama film produced by Walt Disney Pictures and Pixar Animation Studios and distributed by Walt Disney Studios Motion Pictures. Directed by Peter Sohn and produced by Denise Ream from a screenplay by Brenda Hsueh, it features Leah Lewis and Mamoudou Athie in the lead voice roles. Set in a world inhabited by anthropomorphic elements of nature, the story depicts the bond between a fire element Ember (Lewis) and a water element Wade (Athie) who cannot touch each other; but discover how much they have in common.

Following the release of The Good Dinosaur (2015), Sohn began working the project when the idea first started. Elemental draws inspiration from Sohn's youth, growing up as the son of immigrants in New York City during the 1970s, highlighting the city's distinct cultural and ethnic diversity. Thomas Newman, who had worked on prior Pixar animated features, composed the film's musical score.

Elemental is scheduled to be released in the United States on June 16, 2023.

Premise

Voice cast
 Leah Lewis as Ember Lumen, a fire element, described as a "tough, quick-witted and fiery young woman".
 Mamoudou Athie as Wade Ripple, a water element, described as a "fun, sappy, go-with-the-flow guy".

Production

Development 
On May 16, 2022, Pixar announced a new film titled Elemental, with the anthropomorphic classical elements of fire, water, air, and earth as its central theme, with Peter Sohn directing and Denise Ream producing. According to Sohn, the idea for the film was inspired on his experiences as the son of immigrants in New York City in the 1970s. He stated: "My parents emigrated from Korea in the early 1970s and built a bustling grocery store in the Bronx." He also stated: "We were among many families who ventured to a new land with hopes and dreams — all of us mixing into one big salad bowl of cultures, languages, and beautiful little neighborhoods. That's what led me to Elemental." Sohn and Ream reunite after having previously worked together on The Good Dinosaur (2015). Turning Red (2022) creative consultant Brenda Hsueh was hired to write the screenplay.

In an interview with The Hollywood Reporter, Sohn says the film's seven-year development period with Elemental is closely tied to his relationship with his family, when the idea first started, following the release of The Good Dinosaur in 2015. It is also revealed that Ember was born in Elemental City, but grew up in a fire town, since the neighborhoods are sort of split up in different ways. He stated: "I am quite emotional about getting the characters and the story out for sure." He also stated: "This movie is about thanking your parents and understanding their sacrifices. My parents both passed away during the making of this thing. And so, it is hugely emotional, and I'm still processing a lot of it."

Sohn stated at D23: The Official Disney Fan Club: "The concept of the city itself started off with Ember." He also stated: "We thought, 'What's the best city we can build to support Ember's journey of identity and belonging?' It started by thinking about a city that would be hard for fire, and so we based it off of water. The idea is that Water got to this area first, and then Earth came, so it became a delta. Then, they built a water infrastructure with water canals and elevated water channels everywhere, making it even tougher for Ember. Then, Air came in after that, and Fire was one of the last groups to come into the city." Ember and Wade have chemistry, despite the differences. When Sohn first pitched the story and started developing, he stated for himself: "What's fire?" Sohn also stated: "People can see it as a temper. People can see it as passion. As a practical thing, fire burns and sparks—but what does it mean to burn bright? There are all these ingredients to what we already perceive as fire, and that started to form Ember's personality. It's the same thing for Wade. Water can be transparent. What does that mean? He wears his emotions on his sleeve. He goes with the flow. That helped form these personalities that were already pretty opposite, and then we had to find that Venn diagram of where they overlapped. That's the hopeful magic. I hope people can buy into the sparks, the chemical reaction, that could form a relationship."

When asked about being compared to Avatar: The Last Airbender (2005), Sohn said that Elemental is not inspired by Avatar: The Last Airbender, despite their shared concept of personifying classical elements. Sohn stated: "No, it wasn't a touchstone, but I love the show. I saw it with my kids and it's great, but we're so different from it. There's no martial arts in our world. There's not anything like that. It's this city story with the romance, and this family drama. But I do appreciate the connection that people are making just 'cause they love that and hopefully they can love this, too." Sohn also stated:

On September 9, 2022, during the D23 Expo, Sohn, Ream and Pete Docter presented a first look at the film. "Our story is based on the classic elements — fire, water, land, and air. Some elements mix with each other, and some don't," Sohn stated. "What if these elements were alive?" Shortly after the unfinished animation footage, a clip was screened, showing Ember and Wade on a date, walking through a park where Wade tries to impress Ember by running across water, sliding, and creating a romantic rainbow.

According to Variety, at the Disney Content Showcase in Singapore on November 30, 2022, Sohn says that some of the inspiration came from his real-life family and marriage. He showed a picture of him as a child with his parents, saying, "Maybe it's because when I was a kid, I really didn't appreciate or understand what it meant to be an immigrant, to come to the U.S., and all the hard work that they did to give my brother and me our lives. That was one big nugget that was just sitting with me. On the other side, I married someone that wasn’t Korean, and there was a lot of culture clash with that in my world. And that brought to me to this idea of finding opposites. And the question of what if fire fell in love with water came. As an animator, what could be a fun world to play with… so the fire and water is one thing. But then tying that to culture clash, was part of that metaphor. And then in that world, all of a sudden this idea of sacrifice, and understanding what our parents had given started to make the soup of what this film is." He also talks about culture clash and diversity, "It has been the struggle of my life for sure understanding my place and what have I assimilated or my identity being a bifurcated identity. It's always been there, I assume that it'll be always a part of some amount of storytelling – having that kind of that diversity. Will it be a major thing? I don't know. But it's been a part of my life. And I love trying to reflect what the teams that we’ve worked with their lives and our lives into the work that we do."

Sohn also showed footage from the film at the Disney Content Showcase and stated that "The film is about our differences that bring us together, but it is a love story. Hopefully, the audiences will get a deeper understanding of the loss in their lives between the partners, the friends or family."

Casting
On September 9, 2022, during the D23 Expo, Leah Lewis and Mamoudou Athie were revealed to have been cast in the leading voice roles of Ember and Wade, respectively.

Music 
On February 7, 2023, Thomas Newman was confirmed to compose the film's score for Elemental. It marks his fourth collaboration with the studio after Finding Nemo (2003), WALL-E (2008) and Finding Dory (2016), as well as Newman's first Pixar film not to be directed by Andrew Stanton.

Release
Elemental is scheduled to be theatrically released by Walt Disney Studios Motion Pictures in the United States on June 16, 2023. On February 16, 2023, following the commercial failures of Lightyear and Strange World (both 2022), Disney is considering to extending the theatrical windows for both Elemental and Wish in hopes of luring families back to theaters.

Marketing

Following the project announcement, the first look concept art of the film was released on May 16, 2022. Nicole Clark for Polygon said fans are "pointing out the similarities to the Fireboy and Watergirl series of games, six in total, developed by Oslo Albet." Following the voice cast announcement, a first look image and an exclusive teaser poster were released on September 9, 2022, during the 2022 D23 Expo Presentation. The teaser trailer was released on November 17, 2022, set to Bakar's "Hell N Back". Jeremy Mathai of /Film commented positively of the footage, saying it "looks wonderfully rendered and irresistibly charming."

References

External links
 

2020s animated films
2020s children's animated films
2023 computer-animated films
2023 fantasy films
2023 films
2023 romantic drama films
3D animated films
American 3D films
American animated films
American children's animated drama films
American drama films
Films directed by Peter Sohn
Films scored by Thomas Newman
Pixar animated films
Upcoming English-language films
Upcoming films
Walt Disney Pictures animated films